Everyman, in comics, may refer to:

 Everyman (DC Comics), a DC Comics character
 Everyman (Marvel Comics), a Marvel Comics character

See also
Everyman (disambiguation)